Hellfire is a 1949 American Trucolor Western film directed by R. G. Springsteen starring Wild Bill Elliott, Marie Windsor, Forrest Tucker and Jim Davis

Plot
Drifting gambler Zeb Smith promises a dying preacher who saved his life that he'll fulfill the preacher's lifelong goal to build a church.

He needs money and there's a $5,000 reward out for lady outlaw Doll Brown, who has murdered Lew Stoner, her husband. Stoner's brothers Gyp, Red and Dusty are after her as well, as is Zeb's law-abiding pal, Marshal Bucky McLean.

Doll mocks his newfound faith and knocks Zeb unconscious after their first meeting. She rides to Cheyenne to look for her little sister, Jane Carson. The sheriff there, Duffy, tries to arrest Doll, and soon Bucky rides into town, too.

On the run, Zeb and Doll hide out in a cabin. By the time Bucky rides up, Doll's changed her whole look and he doesn't recognize her. Bucky confides to Zeb that he is married to Jane and would like to see Doll dead so no one will ever know Jane's dark family secret, that her sister is a notorious outlaw.

After being captured and roughed up by the Stoner boys, an angry Zeb is deputized by Duffy and goes after them. He arrests Doll, but in jail she gets the drop on him, locking him up. Doll is shot twice by the Stoners, who are about to shoot her again when Zeb manages to do away with all three. In his arms, Doll finally comes to appreciate Zeb's faith in God.

Cast
Wild Bill Elliott as Zeb Smith (as William Elliott
Marie Windsor as Doll Brown, also known as Mary Carson
Forrest Tucker as Bucky McLean
Jim Davis as Gyp Stoner
H. B. Warner as Brother Joseph
Paul Fix as Dusty Stoner
Grant Withers as Sheriff Martin
Emory Parnell as Sheriff Duffy
Esther Howard as Birdie
Jody Gilbert as Full Moon
Louis Faust as Red Stoner (as Louis R. Faust)
Harry Woods as Lew Stoner
Denver Pyle as Rex 
Trevor Bardette as Wilson
Dewey Robinson as Cheyenne Bartender

External links

 
 

1949 films
1949 Western (genre) films
Republic Pictures films
Films about gambling
Films directed by R. G. Springsteen
American Western (genre) films
1940s American films